is a small asteroid and Mars trojan orbiting near the  of Mars (60 degrees behind Mars on its orbit).

Discovery, orbit and physical properties
 was first observed on 16 September 2009 by the Catalina Sky Survey (CSS). Its orbit is characterized by low eccentricity (0.065), moderate inclination (20.6°) and a semi-major axis of 1.52 AU. Upon discovery, it was classified as Mars-crosser by the Minor Planet Center. Its orbit is well determined as it is currently (January 2021) based on 56 observations with a data-arc span of 3,133 days.  has an absolute magnitude of 19.9 which gives a characteristic diameter of 400 m.

Mars trojan and orbital evolution
Recent calculations indicate that it is a stable  Mars trojan with a libration period of 1430 yr and an amplitude of 70°. The libration amplitude is not similar to that of 5261 Eureka and related objects.

Mars trojan 
 (leading):
  †
 (trailing):
 5261 Eureka (1990 MB) †
  †
  †

See also

References

Further reading 
 Three new stable L5 Mars Trojans de la Fuente Marcos, C., de la Fuente Marcos, R. 2013, Monthly Notices of the Royal Astronomical Society: Letters, Vol. 432, Issue 1, pp. 31–35.
 Orbital clustering of Martian Trojans: An asteroid family in the inner solar system? Christou, A. A. 2013, Icarus, Vol. 224, Issue 1, pp. 144–153.

External links 
  data at MPC.
 

Mars trojans

Minor planet object articles (unnumbered)
20090916